Texania is a genus of beetles in the family Buprestidae, containing the following species:

 Texania campestris (Say, 1823)
 Texania fulleri (Horn, 1875)
 Texania langeri (Chevrolat, 1853)

References

Buprestidae genera